DFU may refer to the following:

People
 Dieter F. Uchtdorf (born 1940), German aviator, airline executive and religious leader
 Dmitri Fedorovich Ustinov, former  Minister of Defence of the Soviet Union
 Donald F. Ungurait, the founding Dean of the Florida State University Film School

Organizations
 Dansk Folkepartis Ungdom, the youth wing of the Danish People's Party
 Dutch Fascist Union, a short-lived Fascist organization in the Netherlands
 Den Frie Udstilling, a Danish artists association, founded in 1891
 Dorados Fuerza UACH, a Mexican football club based in Chihuahua, Chihuahua, Mexico

Education
 Dalian Fisheries University, a university in Dalian, China
 Dartmouth Forensic Union, the policy debate team of Dartmouth College

Other
 Device Firmware Upgrade, a vendor- and device-independent mechanism for upgrading the firmware of USB devices
 Diabetic foot ulcer, a major complication of diabetes mellitus
 Drain fixture unit, a unit of measure in plumbing